Taxaceae, commonly called the yew family, is a coniferous family which includes six extant and two extinct genera, and about 30 species of plants, or in older interpretations three genera and 7 to 12 species.

Description 
They are many-branched, small trees and shrubs. The leaves are evergreen, spirally arranged, often twisted at the base to appear 2-ranked. They are linear to lanceolate, and have pale green or white stomatal bands on the undersides.

The plants are dioecious, or rarely monoecious. They are sometimes externally only slightly differentiated from the branches. The fertile bracts have 2-8 pollen sacs.  

The female 'cones' are highly reduced. Only the upper or uppermost bracts are fertile and bear one or rarely two seeds. The ovule usually exceeds the scale, although ovules are sometimes rarely enclosed by it. They may be found on the ends of branches or on the branches. They may grow singly or in tufts or clumps. 

As the seed matures, a fleshy aril partly encloses it. The developmental origin of the aril is unclear, but it may represent a fused pair of swollen leaves. The mature aril is brightly coloured, soft, juicy and sweet, and is eaten by birds which then disperse the hard seed undamaged in their droppings. However, the seeds are highly poisonous to humans, containing the poisons taxine and taxol.

Distribution 
Species are mostly found in the tropics and the southern temperate zones. There are only a few species in the northern hemisphere.

Classification
Taxaceae is now generally included with all other conifers in the order Pinales, as DNA analysis has shown that the yews are phylogenetically nested in the Pinales, a conclusion supported by micromorphology studies. Formerly they were often treated as distinct from other conifers by placing them in a separate order Taxales.  Ernest Henry Wilson referred to Taxaceae as "taxads" in his 1916 book. Taxaceae is thought to be the sister group to Cupressaceae, from which it diverged during the early-mid Triassic. The clade comprising both is sister to Sciadopityaceae, which diverged from them during the early-mid Permian. The oldest confirmed member of Taxaceae is Palaeotaxus rediviva from the earliest Jurassic (Hettangian) of Sweden. Fossils belonging to the living genus Amentotaxus from the Middle Jurassic of China indicate that Taxaceae had already substantially diversified during the Jurassic.

The broadly defined Taxaceae (including Cephalotaxus) comprises six extant genera and about 30 species overall. Cephalotaxus is now included in Taxaceae, rather than being recognized as the core of its own family, Cephalotaxaceae. Phylogenetic evidence strongly supports a very close relationship between Cephalotaxus and other members of Taxaceae, and morphological differences between them are not substantial. However, there are also very clear morphological connections between Cephalotaxus and other members of Taxaceae, and considered in tandem with the phylogenetic evidence, there is no compelling need to recognize Cephalotaxus (or other genera in Taxaceae) as a distinct family,.

Phylogeny
Phylogeny of Taxaceae.

Amentotaxus  – Catkin-yew  
Amentotaxus argotaenia - Catkin yew
Amentotaxus assamica - Assam catkin yew
Amentotaxus formosana - Taiwan catkin yew
Amentotaxus poilanei - Poilane's catkin yew
Amentotaxus yunnanensis - Yunnan catkin yew
Austrotaxus  – New Caledonia yew 
Austrotaxus spicata - New Caledonia yew or southern yew
Cephalotaxus  – Plum yew
Cephalotaxus fortunei - Chinese plum-yew
Cephalotaxus griffithii - Griffith's plum yew
Cephalotaxus hainanensis - Hainan plum-yew
Cephalotaxus harringtonii - Korean plum yew, Japanese plum-yew
Cephalotaxus koreana - Korean plum yew
Cephalotaxus lanceolata - Gongshan plum yew
Cephalotaxus latifolia - Broad-leaved plum yew
Cephalotaxus mannii - Mann's yew plum
Cephalotaxus oliveri - Oliver's plum yew
Cephalotaxus sinensis - Chinese plum yew
Cephalotaxus wilsoniana - Taiwan plum yew, Taiwan cow's-tail pine, or Wilson plum yew
Pseudotaxus  – White-berry yew
Pseudotaxus chienii - the whiteberry yew
Taxus   – Common yew
 Taxus baccata European yew
 Taxus biternata Delicate branch yew
 Taxus brevifolia Pacific yew, western yew
 Taxus caespitosa Caespitosa yew
 Taxus calcicola Asian limestone yew
 Taxus canadensis Canada yew
 Taxus celebica Celebes yew
 Taxus chinensis China yew
 Taxus contorta West Himalayan yew
 Taxus cuspidata Rigid branch yew, Japanese yew
 Taxus fastigiata Irish yew
 Taxus floridana Florida yew
 Taxus florinii Florin yew
 Taxus globosa Mesoamerican yew
 Taxus kingstonii Kingston yew
 Taxus mairei Maire yew
 Taxus obscura Obscure yew
 Taxus ocreata Scaly yew
 Taxus phytonii Phyton yew
 Taxus recurvata English yew
 Taxus rehderiana Rehder yew
 Taxus scutata Scutaceous yew
 Taxus suffnessii Suffness yew
 Taxus sumatrana Sumatera yew
 Taxus umbraculifera Umbrelliform yew
 Taxus wallichiana Wallich yew, East Himalayan yew
Torreya  – Nutmeg yew 
Torreya californica - California torreya
Torreya fargesii - Farges nutmeg tree
Torreya grandis - Chinese nutmeg yew
Torreya jackii - Jack's nutmeg tree, longleaf torreya etc
Torreya nucifera - kaya, Japanese torreya, or Japanese nutmeg-yew
Torreya taxifolia - Gopher wood
 Torreya clarnensis

Footnotes

 
Pinales families
Extant Eocene first appearances